Kain is a 1966 play loosely based on the biblical story of Cain and Abel. It was the first co production between the ABC and the BBC.

1966 stage production

In 1964 Michell returned to Australia after ten years to appear in The First 400 Years. He said "I have always wanted to act in a play by an Australian author out here." He hoped this play would be Kain which he called "a 'country modern' play, essentially Australian, and very rich in comedy – although it is a tragedy."

The play premiered in 1966 at the Yvonne Arnaud Theatre at Guild ford. .

Original cast
Keith Michell
Alan White
Joanna Anin
June Brunell
Redmond Phillips

1967 TV adaptation

A TV adaptation was directed by Lionel Harris and written by Alan Poolman. It was the first collaboration between the BBC and the ABC.

Overview
Brothers Kain and Rattler Sutherland live on a station in the Australian outback. The brothers clash when an Aboriginal maid gives birth to a child which both believe they have fathered.

Cast
Keith Michell as Kain Sutherland
Alan White as Rattler Sutherland
J D Devlin as Old Bill a desert wanderer
Audine Leith as Inala
Candy Devine as Kaita
Roger Cox as Rev. Mr Ramsay
Teddy Plummer as King Brumly
Michael Williams as Jock Mosquito
Aborigines of the Warrabri Government Settlement

Production
The play was announced in March 1966. The script was commissioned by the ABC and BBC and was inspired by the Biblical story of Cain and Abel as well as the painting of Russell Drysdale.

It was filmed in Australia in March and April 1966: exteriors in the Northern Territory near Tennant Creek, at Warrabri and at Devil's Marbles, and interiors at the ABC's Gore Hill studios.

Lionel Harris, the director, Alan Poolman, the writer, and actors Michell, White and Devlin came from London; the rest of the cast were Australian. Props had to be brought in from Sydney. 'The days were long and hard," said Harris.

Harris said the play's theme was "in not taking those closest to you for granted – not living entirely for self. Kain thinks he has no conscience but his discovery that he has provides the play's conflict."

Production design was by Douglas Smith. The budget was reportedly $65,000. Filming took ten days. Chief cameraman was Frank Parnell who later died in a helicopter crash filming a documentary.

Broadcast
The broadcast ran for 90 minutes and aired 17 April 1967.

In the UK it was broadcast in the drama anthology series Theatre 625 as item 17 in series 4. It was thought lost, but survives as 16mm film.

Reception
The Sydney Morning Herald said it "grabbed and gripped with a force we too rarely see on the Box."

The Sunday Sydney Morning Herald TV critic called it "the event of the week" praising the "strong performances from" Michell, White and Devlin and the "superbly photographed outback scenery. The photography ran rings around most routine Hollywood westerns. In colour, it would be a masterpiece." He did say "I felt that author Alan Poolman over-wrote at times. But this is small stuff, weighed alongside the tremendous dramatic impact of the play as a whole".

The London Times said it had "great emotional power."

The Age thought it was "an essentially melodramatic play" but said "Michell's performance turned into something of breathtaking strength."

The Bulletin called it "awful... Save us from expatriate playwrights such as Alan Poolman, who marry some childish sense of what is Australian to a   more thorough idea of how to write bad drama" in which Michell "was less than unimpressive, matched only by Alan White... What possessed BBC-TV and ABC TV to film it?   Well, television people have some weird ideas about the Outback, there’s no other explanation. Let’s hope the British viewers took it all at face value—as only a bad joke."

The Sunday Sydney Morning Herald critic later reflected "I can't remember a TV show which has split the critics into two such violent camps" as Kain in Australia and England. "Did we all see the same thing or were there two of them?"

References

External links
Kain at AustLit
Kain TV movie at BFI
Kain at Ausstage

Australian television plays